Shampa Sinha is a doctor and writer with previous careers in diplomacy and public health. She is best known for her poem Siesta, which won the First Prize in the Fifth National Poetry Competition in 1993 organized by The Poetry Society (India) in collaboration with British Council.

Biography
A cultural hybrid, Shampa was born in India but grew up in England, Zambia and Papua New Guinea. After studying economics and law at the University of Tasmania, Australia, she joined the Australian Department of Foreign Affairs and Trade. After short-term missions as part of the Australian delegation to the United Nations to Bangkok, New York and Geneva, she had a long-term posting in the political and economic section of the Australian Embassy in Mexico City. She resigned from the foreign service in 2003 after being awarded the Sasakawa Young Leaders' Scholarship to study at Princeton University's Woodrow Wilson School of International and Public Affairs. After graduating from Princeton, she worked at the World Bank's Washington D.C. headquarters before deciding to return to Australia to attend medical school.

She currently practices as a doctor in Australia. Throughout her career changes, she has continued to write poetry, short stories, travel articles and, more recently, narrative essays in medicine which have been published in 100 Words (a journal published by the University of Iowa's International Writing Program), The Australian newspaper, Australian Doctor, the Calcutta Statesman, Hektoen International, the Post Courier (PNG) and the Times of Papua New Guinea.

Awards
Shampa won All India Poetry Prize in 1993 for her poem "Siesta". Peter Forbes, Editor, Poetry Review, London, who was the Chairman of the awarding committee, described her as the best promising young poet in English from India. Shampa Sinha had also won the Special Prize for Young Poet in the Third National Poetry Competition 1991 for her poem "The Difference".

See also

 Indian English literature
 Indian poetry
 The Poetry Society (India)

References

Sources
 "Poetry Splash" – Select Indian poems
 "Caferati" British Council Poetry Contests
  "She Writes" – Shampa Sinha
  "Bucharest and Beyond" – Article in The Australian
 http://www.princeton.edu/~prism/fall04/creative.html
 http://www.theaustralian.com.au/life/travel/walking-a-citys-streets-offers-unique-insights-for-the-traveller/news-story/7d33bda8751e211ec9f5234f0d73576b
 http://www.theaustralian.com.au/life/travel/teachers-capital-idea-brings-health-clinic-to-a-village/news-story/d3ef1510f492f3bcaa7c67400ad5cd3f
 "The World Within Their Heads", essay in From Where I Stand https://www.amazon.com.au/Where-Stand-Essays-General-Practice-ebook/dp/B00GYPFSM0
 "Snakes and Ladders" http://hekint.org/2018/01/29/snakes-and-ladders/
 "Percy's Last Day" https://hekint.org/2018/04/18/percys-last-day/

Australian poets
English-language poets from India
Year of birth missing (living people)
Living people
21st-century Indian women writers
21st-century Indian writers
Australian women poets
All India Poetry Prize